Pogana is a commune in Vaslui County, Western Moldavia, Romania. It is composed of five villages: Bogești, Cârjoani, Măscurei, Pogana and Tomești.

Natives
 Gheorghe Cosma

References

Communes in Vaslui County
Localities in Western Moldavia